Notre Dame-Bishop Gibbons High School is a private, Roman Catholic middle and high school in Schenectady, New York.  It is located within the Roman Catholic Diocese of Albany. Enrollment for the 2021–2022 school year was 201 students. The 2021-2022 tuition was $7,583 (grade 6), $8,058 (7-8), and $8,658 (9-12).

Background
Bishop Gibbons High School was established in 1958 as an all-boys school. Bishop Gibbons was founded by the Irish Christian brothers. Notre Dame High School was established in 1960 as an all-girls high school.  Bishop Gibbons and Notre Dame merged in 1975. Grades 7 and 8 were added in 1989 and Grade 6 was added in 1996. They won the Class B NYSPHSAA State Men's Cross Country Championship in 2012, their first state championship in school history. The school principal is Patrick Moran.

Notable alumni
Jim Tedisco and Antonio Delgado both attended Bishop Gibbons.

Notes and references

External links
 Current Website

Catholic secondary schools in New York (state)
Educational institutions established in 1958
Roman Catholic Diocese of Albany
Buildings and structures in Schenectady, New York
Schools in Schenectady County, New York
1958 establishments in New York (state)
Private middle schools in New York (state)